T-Mobile MDA (Mobile Digital Assistant) is a series of T-Mobile-branded phones manufactured by HTC Corporation of Taiwan:

References

HTC mobile phones